The Biddeford–Saco Mills Historic District encompasses the historic mill complex that flanks both sides of the Saco River in Biddeford and Saco, Maine. The district was added to the National Register of Historic Places in 2008. Many of the buildings in the district have been rehabilitated and repurposed for other uses, including residential, commercial, and industrial.

Description 

The district has more than forty historically significant structures spread across . Six buildings are located on Saco Island, south of Gooch Street and west of Main Street. In Biddeford, the district is bounded on the south by Main, York, and Lancaster Streets, on the west by Lincoln Street, and on the north by Pearl Street.

History
The industrial history of the Saco–Biddeford area began in the 1760s, when Thomas Cutts, a merchant and ship owner purchased the island in the Saco River between the two city centers. Now within Saco city limits, it became known as Cutts Island, later called Saco Island. 

Cutts established a lumber mill and in 1811 iron works founded by Cutts and Josiah Calef. 
In 1826 the first textile mill was built on the island. The oldest building in the mill complex was built in 1832-33 by the York Manufacturing Company. From this beginning the industrial growth of the area proceeded, occupying the entire island and a large adjacent area on the Biddeford shore. The most recent historically significant building was built about 1940.

See also
National Register of Historic Places listings in York County, Maine

References

Buildings and structures in Biddeford, Maine
Buildings and structures in Saco, Maine
Historic districts in York County, Maine
Industrial buildings and structures on the National Register of Historic Places in Maine
Historic districts on the National Register of Historic Places in Maine
National Register of Historic Places in York County, Maine